Semyon Vladimirovich Nastusenko (born 16 November 1986) is a Russian former professional footballer.

Club career
He made his professional debut in the Russian Second Division in 2005 for FC Saturn Yegoryevsk.

He played 2 seasons in the Russian Football National League for FC KAMAZ Naberezhnye Chelny.

References

1986 births
People from Dagestan
Living people
Russian footballers
Association football defenders
FC KAMAZ Naberezhnye Chelny players
FC Sokol Saratov players
FC Saturn Ramenskoye players
FC Avangard Kursk players
FC Neftekhimik Nizhnekamsk players
FC Dynamo Vologda players
Sportspeople from Dagestan